The 1968 Munster Senior Club Hurling Championship was the fifth staging of the Munster Senior Club Hurling Championship since its establishment by the Munster Council.

on 26 March 1972, Newmarket-on-Fergus won the championship after a 5-08 to 4-03 defeat of Ballygunner in the final at Walsh Park. It was their second championship title overall and their second title in succession.

Results

First round

Semi-finals

Final

References

External links
 Munster Senior Club Hurling Champions

1968 in hurling
Munster Senior Club Hurling Championship